The Financial Review Rich List, formerly known as the BRW Rich 200, is a list of Australia's two hundred wealthiest individuals and families, ranked by personal net worth published annually in The Australian Financial Review Magazine, a supplement of The Australian Financial Review, published by Nine Publishing. The list provides a short summary on some of the known business activities of the individuals and families, together with commentary on how their ranking has changed from the previous year, if listed.

The list was historically released annually in May or June in a special issue of the Business Review Weekly (BRW), published by Fairfax Media. The final hardcopy issue of BRW was published in November 2013, and between 2014 and March 2016, the list was published online only. In March 2016 the BRW Rich 200 was published in hardcopy in The Australian Financial Review Magazine (or  AFR Magazine), and published online on the Financial Review website. In 2017, the list was renamed as the Financial Review Rich List, published in both print and online. The most recent list was published in May 2021.

In 2021, the entry mark for the 200th richest individual was 590 million an increase of 50 million on the 2020 entry mark. The wealthiest individual in the 2021 list was Gina Rinehart, estimated to have a personal net worth of 31.06 billion. Rinehart held the mantle of Australia's wealthiest individual between 2011 and 2015; and was also the wealthiest individual in 2020, when her net worth was assessed at 28.89 bn. Rinehart succeeded Anthony Pratt and family, who held the mantle of Australia's wealthiest individual between 2017 and 2019, and also in 2009. Pratt succeeded Harry Triguboff who topped the list in 2016, when it was estimated he had a personal net worth of 10.62 billion.

Ten individuals and/or families have made every list; including Maurice Alter, Lindsay Fox, John Gandel, David Hains, John Kahlbetzer, Solomon Lew, Frank Lowy, Alan Rydge, Kerry Stokes, and Harry Triguboff.

In 2014 fourteen women and 186 men made the BRW Rich 200 list; and by 2017 the number of women had increased to fifteen women; increased to nineteen women (either jointly or severally) in the list published in 2018; in 2019, twenty-six women were included on the 2019 Rich List, representing 13 percent of the total list; in 2020, the number of women included on the list, either jointly or severally, increased to 30 women; and increased again to 39 women on the 2021 list; representing 19.5 percent of the total list.

The 2021 list was dominated in value by those whose source of wealth is from resources (107.8 bn), followed by property (105 bn), technology (78.4 bn), retail (51.6 bn) and finance (44.8 bn). From the 1980s through until mid-2000s, mass media was the traditional wealth creation source. The combined wealth of the 200 individuals in 2021 was assessed at 479.6 billion; and the average wealth for the 200 on the 2021 list reached 2.40 billion. 2017 was the first year that average wealth exceeded one billion dollars.

Background and history
The Financial Review Rich List was first published in 1984 as the BRW Rich 100, with an entry point of 10 million, that profiled 144 people and 20 families.

In 2008 it was the first time in more than 20 years that Kerry or James Packer had not headed the list. Andrew Forrest was listed as the richest person in Australia, with a net worth estimated at 9.41 billion, with James Packer listed third with 6.1 billion. In 2009 Pratt was top of the list with 4.3 billion. In 2010, the founder of Westfield, Frank Lowy, who has appeared on the list every year, was Australia's richest individual with an assessed personal net worth of 5.04 billion. Rinehart held the mantle between 2011 and 2015; and Triguboff in 2016. Pratt held the mantle again, between 2017 and 2019. Rinehart returned in 2020 as Australia's wealthiest individual, and retained the mantle in 2021.

The list has sometimes caught the ire of those profiled. In an essay celebrating the 25th anniversary of the BRW, Jefferson Penberthy, the founding editor of the BRW Rich 100 wrote that Australian entrepreneur Dick Smith, at one stage valued at 50 million, did not want to appear on the list. When told that the cut off was 35 million, Smith publicly divested 20 million to charities.

The Financial Review Rich List excludes individuals who have renounced their Australian citizenship. For example, despite Rupert Murdoch being born in Australia and having a personal net wealth of 7.6 billion in 2011, due to Murdoch becoming a naturalised US citizen in 1985, he was excluded from the list.

The BRW Rich Families List was first published annually between 2008 and 2015. In every year of its publication the Smorgon family has headed the list, with estimated wealth of 2.74 billion in 2015 spread across seven branches of the family. In 2015 the list comprised fifty families with an entry point of 302 million. The families list has not been published in hard copy or online since 2015.

On 4 March 2016, Fairfax Media announced the closure of the BRW website, and redirected the site to a new section of The Australian Financial Review. Rich lists are now published in The Australian Financial Review Magazine and in 2017 were rebranded as the Financial Review Rich List.

The Financial Review Rich List is one list in a series of lists published by the Financial Review and/or were previously published by the BRW. Other lists included:
the BRW Rich series; covering BRW Executive Rich, BRW Young Rich, and BRW Rich Summer
the BRW Fast list series; covering BRW Fast Starters, BRW Fast Franchises, and BRW Fast 100
the BRW Top list series; covering Top 1000 Companies, Top 50 Entertainers, and Top 500 Private Companies

Lists by year 
 BRW Rich 100, 1984 
 BRW Rich 200, 1985
 BRW Rich 200, 1986
 BRW Rich 200, 1987
 BRW Rich 200, 1988
 BRW Rich 200, 1989
 BRW Rich 200, 1990
 BRW Rich 200, 1991
 BRW Rich 200, 1992
 BRW Rich 200, 1993
 BRW Rich 200, 1994
 BRW Rich 200, 1995
 BRW Rich 200, 1996
 BRW Rich 200, 1997
 BRW Rich 200, 1998
 BRW Rich 200, 1999
 BRW Rich 200, 2000
 BRW Rich 200, 2001
 BRW Rich 200, 2002
 BRW Rich 200, 2003
 BRW Rich 200, 2004
 BRW Rich 200, 2005
 BRW Rich 200, 2006
 BRW Rich 200, 2007
 BRW Rich 200, 2008
 BRW Rich 200, 2009
 BRW Rich 200, 2010
 BRW Rich 200, 2011
 BRW Rich 200, 2012
 BRW Rich 200, 2013
 BRW Rich 200, 2014
 BRW Rich 200, 2015
 BRW Rich 200, 2016
 Financial Review Rich List, 2017
 Financial Review Rich List, 2018
 Financial Review Rich List, 2019
 Financial Review Rich List, 2020
 Financial Review Rich List, 2021

Past richest Australian

See also

Forbes Asia: Australia's 50 Richest, an annual published list of rich individuals in Australia, by Forbes Asia magazine
Forbes China Rich List, the annual published list of rich individuals in China
Challenges Les 500, the annual published list of rich individuals in France
Forbes Korean Rich List, the annual published list of rich individuals in South Korea
Sunday Times Rich List, the annual published list of rich individuals in the United Kingdom
Forbes 400, the annual published list of rich individuals in the United States of America
 BRW Fast Starters
Australian Financial Review

References

External links
 Financial Review Rich List 2019
 AFR lists
 BRW Rich 200 List
 BRW Rich Families Wealth List

Financial Review Rich List
Australia
1984 establishments in Australia

Top lists